Henry Campbell Black (October 17, 1860 – March 19, 1927) was the founder of Black's Law Dictionary, the definitive legal dictionary first published in 1891.

Born in Ossining, New York, he was also the editor of The Constitutional Review from 1917 until his death in 1927.

Books

1910 edition free e-book

Sources
 Who Was Who in America. A component volume of Who's Who in American History, Volume 1, 1897-1942 (Chicago: A.N. Marquis Co., 1943), page 100

External links
 

American book publishers (people)
People from Ossining, New York
1860 births
1927 deaths